New Routes out of Innerland is a follow-up reworking of Mark Peters' debut solo album, Innerland. Released on 19 April 2019, it comprises all eight original album tracks, reworked by artists including Ulrich Schnauss, Brian Case and Odd Nosdam. It is referenced as Peters' "final visit" to his debut solo album, and was released on CD, digital and green vinyl. The album sees Peters "looking outwards, away from the bleak, post-industrial landscapes of Wigan, and inviting eight different artists from around the world to interpret and translate the instrumentals of Innerland into their own musical and geographical languages."

Track listing

Personnel

Musicians
 Mark Peters: Guitar, piano, synth, programming.
 Craig Sergeant: Harmonica on 3.
 Matthew Linley: Drums on 4 and 8.

Producers
 Written, produced and mixed by Mark Peters.

Other personnel

Mastered by Carim Clasmann.
Design by Marc Jones.
Navigation by Nathaniel Cramp.

References

External links
New Routes out of Innerland on Bandcamp
New Routes out of Innerland on Discogs
Olga Wojciechowska website post
24 New Songs Out Today - BrooklynVegan

2019 remix albums
Mark Peters (musician) albums